SuperBrawl IX was the ninth SuperBrawl professional wrestling pay-per-view (PPV) event produced by World Championship Wrestling (WCW). The event took place on February 21, 1999 from the Oakland Arena in Oakland, California.

Storylines
The event featured wrestlers from pre-existing scripted feuds and storylines. Wrestlers portrayed villains, heroes, or less distinguishable characters in the scripted events that built tension and culminated in a wrestling match or series of matches.

Event

The match of Barry Windham and Curt Hennig against Chris Benoit and Dean Malenko was the final of a double-elimination tournament. Entering the match, Benoit and Malenko had already lost once while Windham and Hennig were undefeated. Malenko forced Windham to submit with The Texas Cloverleaf for the first fall. Windham pinned Malenko for the second fall and the Tag Team Championships after choking Malenko out with his belt.

Kevin Nash pinned Rey Misterio, Jr. after an Outsider's Edge from Scott Hall. As a result of the match, Misterio was forced to unmask; had Konnan and Misterio won, Miss Elizabeth would have been shaved bald. This match was originally supposed to involve Lex Luger as Kevin Nash's tag team partner against Misterio and Konnan, but Luger suffered a bicep injury at the hands of Misterio three days earlier on Thunder and was immediately replaced by Scott Hall.

Hollywood Hogan pinned Ric Flair after David Flair turned heel and used a Stun Gun on his own father, joining the nWo Elite in the process.

Reception
In 2007, Arnold Furious of 411Mania gave the event a rating of 5.0 [Not So Good], stating, "The undercard was ok but the main events dragged it down and there’s nothing SO amazing on the undercard to go and check it out for. This show got really positive reviews at the time but I think that was entirely down to it not being shit. The tale end of 1998 set the standard of PPV so LOW for WCW that generally people didn’t expect anything when they ordered a WCW show. When they got something they ended up being really happy about it. But if you look at the booking they totally fucked the fans over. They knew Flair was losing and still jobbed out Benoit & Malenko, Rey Jr, DDP and put the US title on Scott Hall. Yeah, Goldberg went over but if he’d have lost then WCW would have had to be completely gaga. Thumbs in the middle for this one but no real recommendation to check it out."

Results

References

External links
SuperBrawl IX

SuperBrawl 9
Professional wrestling in California
Events in Oakland, California
1999 in California
February 1999 events in the United States
1999 World Championship Wrestling pay-per-view events